"St. Bernard's School", and variants is a frequently used school name, or part of a school name, and may refer to:

United Kingdom 
 St Bernard's High School, Westcliff-on-Sea, Essex, England
 St Bernard's Catholic High School, Furness, Cumbria, England
 St Bernard's Catholic High School, Rotherham, South Yorkshire, England
 St Michael's Catholic School (formerly known as St Augustine and St Bernard's Catholic School), High Wycombe, Buckinghamshire, England
 St Bernard's Catholic Grammar School, Slough, Berkshire, England

United States 
 St. Bernard's School, New York City
 St. Bernard Preparatory School, Cullman, Alabama
 St. Bernard's High School (Eureka, California), Eureka, California
 St. Bernard High School (Los Angeles, California), Los Angeles, California
 Saint Bernard School, Uncasville, Connecticut
 St. Bernard High School (St. Bernard Parish, Louisiana), a former school in the St. Bernard Parish Public Schools district
 St. Bernard Unified School, St. Bernard Parish, Louisiana
 St. Bernard's High School (Fitchburg, Massachusetts), Fitchburg, Massachusetts
 Saint Bernard's High School (Saint Paul, Minnesota), Saint Paul, Minnesota
 St. Bernard-Elmwood Place High School, St. Bernard, Ohio

Canada 
 St. Bernard Catholic School, Ottawa, Ontario

Zimbabwe
 St. Bernard's High School (Bulawayo, Zimbabwe), Bulawayo, Zimbabwe